Time in Advance (no ISBN) is a collection of four short stories by American science fiction writer William Tenn (a pseudonym  of Philip Klass). The stories all originally appeared in a number of different publications between 1952 and 1957.

Time in Advance was first published by Bantam Books as a paperback in 1958 and also published as a hardcover in the United Kingdom by Victor Gollancz in 1963, followed a hardcover edition in 1964 published in the United Kingdom by the Science Fiction Book Club and by a Panther paperback edition in April 1966.

Contents
Dedication: "To Fruma: For being there during Winthrop at his worst and life at its best"

Fruma Klass was Philip Klass's (William Tenn's) wife, Winthrop being the name of the title character of the final story in the collection.

"Firewater"
(Astounding Science Fiction, February 1952)

Plot
The Earth is visited by large, enigmatic alien spheres, who take up residence in colonies on several prairies and deserts across the world. They make visits to cities, factories and other areas of human activity, seemingly to merely float and observe. All attempts at communication are unsuccessful and despite the best efforts of mankind, no one is able to decipher their intentions. Some, however, have come in to close encounter with the aliens, and emerged dramatically altered beings. These people, called humanity-prime, and dubbed 'primeys', are highly intelligent, can bend matter to their will, but are also, by human standards, quite, quite mad. Algernon Hebster is a highly successful businessman, owing mostly to his dealings with primeys, who supply him with the knowledge for advanced technologies which he puts to use in commerce. The problem is that primeys are so dangerous that dealing with them is highly illegal and every attempt is made to confine them to the reservations around their perceived alien masters.

"Time in Advance"
(Galaxy Science Fiction, August 1956)

Plot
In the far future a law is passed enabling citizens to serve out sentences for crimes they intend to commit, serving the full term, but with a 50% pre-criminal discount. Post-criminals and pre-criminals alike are sent to carry out hard-labour on hellishly perilous, far-flung Convict Planets. Few return. Those pre-criminals who are not killed, drop out before their terms are up, with nothing but scars and nightmares to show for their troubles. Two pre-criminals however, 'Blotto' Otto Henck and Nicholas Crandall, manage against all the odds to serve out two full terms for murder, and return to Earth as minor celebrities, with the right to kill one person each. Things, however, do not go quite as planned. Blotto Otto has his scheming wife in mind, only to find out she died the previous year in an unfortunate accident. For Crandall, whose life has been a perpetual series of failures, things go even worse. He intends to kill Frederick Stephenson, a man who stole his great invention. However, on his return, he receives a call from his terrified beloved ex-wife, who thinks she is his intended victim for her series of infidelities whilst they were married. Next he receives a call from his ex-business partner, pleading for his life because he thinks he is the intended victim for secretly cheating him out of vast sums of money. Crandall was previously unaware of either of these things. Still reeling, he meets his own brother, who thinks he is the intended victim, and reveals it was he with whom Crandall's wife was cheating. Finally, Crandall calls his intended victim, Stephenson, the only one who fails to twist and squirm, but instead offers Crandall fair settlement for his invention. Shattered by the day's events, Crandall succumbs to the realization that he is one of life's born losers, and sets out with Otto to have some fun.

"The Sickness"
(Infinity Science Fiction, November 1955)

Plot
The Earth finds itself on the brink of catastrophic nuclear war between Russia and the United States. As a last-ditch symbolic gesture of peace and cooperation, the two nations, presided over by India, launch a joint crewed venture to Mars. On their arrival to the red planet, Nicolai Belov, a Russian member of the crew, discovers a vast and amazing city once populated by human-like beings. However, once he returns to the ship he quickly develops a strange fever and is quarantined. This raises tensions in the already fraught atmosphere on board, and threatens to throw power amongst the crew out of balance. Equilibrium is restored, however, when American crew member Smathers also comes down with what is now dubbed Belov's disease. One by one the crew succumb, falling through several stages of fever and delirium, leaving prospects of return ever slimmer, and prospects of war on Earth ever greater: Mutual suspicion over the loss of the mission would trigger the final conflict. Soon just one crewmember remains healthy, American astronaut O'Brien. Just when he thinks all is over, Belov and Smathers awake from their fevers, only they aren't quite the same. They have acquired super-human powers and intelligence, able to shape matter at will and communicate telepathically. O'Brien discovers that Belov's isn't a disease at all, but a fantastic symbiotic bacilli. Just when he realises that the problems of the Earth are over and a new era has dawned, Smathers reveals one final thing: Some people, like him, are naturally immune...

"Winthrop Was Stubborn"
(Galaxy Science Fiction, August 1957, published under the title "Time Waits for Winthrop")

Plot

The unstated present has been contacted by the future, when time travel is possible and hedonism is the norm. Five present individuals have been selected to travel to the future, while five compatible individuals have been selected to travel to the past. The compatibility of each time traveler to one traveling in the opposite directions is described as vital to the method, without a perfect balance of travelers it is impossible.
The story opens when the present day travelers find themselves stranded in the future. The problem is the oldest of them, Winthrop, refuses to return to the past thus leaving all of them trapped. In the present he was merely a bum, but in the future he's a curio and encouraged to indulge his tastes to the point of gluttony.
Each of them is forced to confront the part of the future they find the most distasteful. The first, an elderly lady, has to meet with Winthrop and plead with him to release them by returning. The scientist has to attend the great computer to seek advice on the situation, which he finds morally objectionable. In any case, the computer tells him to simply return to the others, as the story concludes with a twist.

Reception

Anthony Boucher received the collection enthusiastically, describing the two novellas included as "models absolute of extrapolative with and insight" while finding the shorter stories "of almost comparable quality."

Adaptations
The story "Time in Advance" was adapted in 1965 by Paul Erickson as one of twelve episodes of the first series of BBC anthology series Out of the Unknown. The episode survives, and has been released on DVD.

References

External links
 
 Out of the Unknown
 Bibliography of William Tenn

1958 short story collections
Science fiction short story collections
Works by William Tenn
Bantam Books books